Marietta Historic District is a national historic district located at Marietta, Lancaster County, Pennsylvania. The district includes 373 contributing buildings in the central business district and surrounding residential areas of Marietta.  The district includes notable examples of the Italianate and Federal architectural styles.  Notable buildings include the Duffy House, Marietta Community Center, Shelly House, the Pierre de Vittry House (c. 1825), Marietta Theater, First Farmers' Bank, David Smith House, English Presbyterian Church (1853, 1898, 1909), Liquor Control Board Office, the Railroad Hotel, Union House Gallery, Eckmans Hotel, White Swan Inn, Henry Musselman House, former Grove Hotel, and the Old Town Hall.

It was listed on the National Register of Historic Places in 1978, with a boundary increase in 1984.

References

External links

Historic districts on the National Register of Historic Places in Pennsylvania
Federal architecture in Pennsylvania
Italianate architecture in Pennsylvania
Historic districts in Lancaster County, Pennsylvania
National Register of Historic Places in Lancaster County, Pennsylvania